The Lancaster Roses were an American basketball team member of the American Basketball League based in Lancaster, Pennsylvania.

The franchise was terminated by the league on December 4, 1947.

Year-by-year

Basketball teams in Pennsylvania
Sports in Lancaster, Pennsylvania
American Basketball League (1925–1955) teams
1947 establishments in Pennsylvania
1947 disestablishments in Pennsylvania
Basketball teams established in 1947
Basketball teams disestablished in 1947